The 1928 Princeton Tigers football team represented Princeton University in the 1928 college football season. The Tigers finished with a 5–1–2 record under 15th-year head coach Bill Roper. Princeton center Charles Howe was selected by the Associated Press as a first-team honoree on the 1928 College Football All-America Team.

Schedule

References

Princeton
Princeton Tigers football seasons
Princeton Tigers football